Khovd, formerly known as Kobdo or Khobdo, is the capital of the Khovd Province of Mongolia. It is officially known as Jargalant sum.

Geography and climate

It is situated at the foot of the Mongol Altay Mountains, on the Buyant River. The Khar-Us Lake is located approximately 25 km east of Khovd and is the location of a Strictly Protected Area (Mongolian Government designation), called the Mankhan Nature Preserve.

As a result of administrative reforms in 1992, Khovd was accorded the status of Jargalant sum. City area is 80 km2.

Khovd has a cold desert climate (Köppen climate classification BWk) with long, dry, frigid winters and short warm summers. Precipitation is minimal and very heavily concentrated in summer.

History
The city was established by Galdan Boshogtu Khan of Dzungaria in the 17th century on the bank of the river Khovd in what is now Erdenebüren sum. Horticulture was developed around city Khovd using the land cultivating experience from Taranchi and Central Asian captives. The city was 'moved' by the Qing administration after destruction of the Dzungar Khanate after 1757 on to the bank of the river Buyant.
On 7 August 1912, the Mongol troops under leadership of Manlai Baatur Damdinsuren, Khatanbaatar Magsarjav and Ja Lama Dambiijantsan captured the city of Khovd, destroyed all the Manchu-Chinese garrisons and abolished the governance of the Qing-appointed amban.

Population
The city had a population of 26,023 in 2000 (2000 census), 30,479 in 2003 (2003, est.) and 28,601 in 2007 (2007).

In 2005, Jargalant sum (the centre of Khovd Aimag) had 32,351 inhabitants (6,675 households), belonging to more than ten ethnic groups and nationalities such as Uuld, Khalkh, Zakhchin, Torguud, Uriankhai, Myangad, Dörbet, Bayads, Kazak, Chantuu and Üzemchin.

See also
 Sangiin Kerem

References

Aimag centers
Districts of Khovd Province
Populated places established in the 17th century